Japan participated in the 1974 Asian Games held in Tehran, Iran from September 1, 1974 to September 16, 1974. This country was ranked 1st with 72 gold medals, 51 silver medals and 49 bronze medals with a total of 172 medals to secure its top spot in the medal tally.

References

Nations at the 1974 Asian Games
1974
Asian Games